The Constitution of the People's Socialist Republic of Albania was the constitution used in the People's Socialist Republic of Albania. The constitution, promulgated on 28 December 1976, established Albania as a "People's Socialist Republic". The constitution was based on the original 1946 constitution that established post-World War II Albania as a "People's Republic".

See also
List of constitutions of Albania
Agitation and Propaganda against the State
Cultural and Ideological Revolution
Albanian state atheism

References

 
People's Socialist Republic of Albania
Legal history of Albania
1976 in Albania
1976 in law
1976 documents
December 1976 events in Europe
1976 in politics